Mogudu means Husband in Telugu language. It may refer to:

 Athaku Yamudu Ammayiki Mogudu, a Telugu film produced by Allu Aravind
 Donga Mogudu, a 1987 Tollywood film
 Gharana Mogudu, a Telugu film
 Mogudu (film), a 2011 Telugu film directed by Krishna Vamsi
 Mogudu Kaavali, a Telugu film starring Chiranjeevi
 Mogudu Pellam O Dongodu, a Telugu film directed by Venky
 Yamudiki Mogudu, a 1988 Telugu film